Ghasem Rassaeli was an Iranian boxer. He competed in the men's flyweight event at the 1948 Summer Olympics.

References

External links
 

Year of birth missing
Year of death missing
Iranian male boxers
Olympic boxers of Iran
Boxers at the 1948 Summer Olympics
Place of birth missing
Flyweight boxers
20th-century Iranian people